The Battle of Messines was fought in October 1914 between the armies of the German empire and British empire and France as part of the Race to the Sea, between the river Douve and the Comines–Ypres canal.

Background

Strategic developments
From  the belligerents had made reciprocal attempts to turn the northern flank of their opponent. By the next day French attacks north of the Aisne, led to Falkenhayn ordering the 6th Army to repulse French forces to secure the flank.

On 24 September, the French advance met a German attack rather than an open flank and by 29 September, having been reinforced to eight corps, the Second Army was still being opposed by German forces near Lille, rather than advancing around an open German northern (right) flank. The 6th Army had also found that on arrival in the north, it was forced to oppose the French, rather than advance around their northern (left) flank and that the secondary objective of protecting the northern flank of the German armies in France had become the main task.

Tactical developments
By 6 October the French needed British reinforcements to withstand German attacks around Lille. The British Expeditionary Force (BEF) had begun to move from the Aisne to Flanders on 5 October and reinforcements from England assembled on the left flank of the Tenth Army, which had been formed from the units on the left (northern) flank of the Second Army on 4 October. The Allies and the Germans attempted to take more ground after the "open" northern flank had disappeared, Franco-British attacks towards Lille in October, being followed up by attempts to advance between the BEF and the Belgian army by a new French Eighth Army. The moves of the German 7th Army and then the 6th Army from Alsace and Lorraine had been intended to secure German lines of communication through Belgium, where the Belgian army had sortied several times during the period between the Franco-British Great Retreat and the First Battle of the Marne. In August British marines had landed at Dunkirk and in October a new German 4th Army was assembled from the III Reserve Corps, the siege artillery used against Antwerp and four of the new reserve corps training in Germany.

Prelude

Flanders terrain

The North-west of France and the south-west Belgium were known as Flanders. West of a line between Arras and Calais in the north-west, lay chalk downlands, covered with soil sufficient for arable farming. East of the line, the land declines in a series of spurs into the Flanders plain, bounded by canals linking Douai, Béthune, St. Omer and Calais. To the south-east, canals ran between Lens, Lille, Roubaix and Courtrai, the Lys river from Courtrai to Ghent and to the north-west lay the sea. The plain was almost flat, apart from a line of low hills from Cassel, east to Mont des Cats, Mont Noir, Mont Rouge, Scherpenberg and Mont Kemmel. From Kemmel, a low ridge lay to the north-east, declining in elevation past Ypres, through Wytschaete, Gheluvelt and Passchendaele, curving north and then north-west to Diksmuide, where it merged with the plain. Inland the ground was mainly meadow, cut by canals, dykes, drainage ditches and roads built up on causeways. The Lys, Yser and upper Scheldt had been canalised and between them the water level underground was close to the surface, rose further in the autumn and filled any dip, the sides of which then collapsed. The ground surface quickly turned to a consistency of cream cheese and on the coast troops were confined to roads, except during frosts.

The rest of the Flanders Plain was woods and small fields, divided by hedgerows planted with trees and cultivated from small villages and farms. The terrain was difficult for infantry operations because of the lack of observation, impossible for mounted action because of the many obstructions and difficult for artillery because of the limited view. South of La Bassée Canal around Lens and Béthune was a coal-mining district full of slag heaps, pit-heads and miners' houses. North of the canal, the city of Lille, Tourcoing and Roubaix formed a manufacturing complex, with outlying industries at Armentières, Comines, Halluin and Menin, along the Lys river. With isolated sugar beet and alcohol refineries and a steel works near Aire-sur-la-Lys, the intervening areas were agricultural, with wide roads on shallow foundations and unpaved mud tracks in France, narrow pavé roads along the frontier and in Belgium. In France, the roads were closed by the local authorities during thaws, to preserve the surface and marked by  signs, which were ignored by British lorry drivers. The difficulty of movement after the end of summer absorbed much of the local labour on road maintenance, leaving field defences to be built by front-line soldiers.

British preparations

The cavalry was ordered to extend as far north as Ypres. On 12 October, the British cavalry advanced and found the Germans dug in on Mont des Cats and at Flêtre, on the road from Cassel to Bailleul. The 3rd Cavalry Brigade attacked Mont des Cats, up slopes covered in hop-fields towards a monastery on the hilltop, with dismounted cavalry attacking from the west and mounted cavalry with a battery of horse artillery from the south. On 14 October, the cavalry advanced north-eastwards, occupied Dranoutre and Kemmel against slight opposition and then reached a line from Dranoutre to Wytschaete, linking with the 3rd Cavalry Division of IV Corps, which had been operating in Belgium since early October.

On 15 October, the cavalry was ordered to reconnoitre the Lys from Estaires to Menin. A foothold was gained at Warneton and German outposts at Houthen and Hollebeke, west of the Ypres–Comines canal, were pushed back to the far side. By the end of 15 October, the Cavalry Corps and the 3rd Cavalry Division held the Lys river from Armentières to Comines and the Comines canal to Ypres. The BEF was ordered to make a general advance on 16 October, as the German forces were falling back, except for III Reserve Corps, which was advancing westwards from Antwerp. The cavalry were ordered to cross the Lys between Armentières and Menin as the III Corps advanced north-east, to clear the way for the cavalry and gain touch with the 7th Division near Ypres.

The banks of the Lys were cut by boggy streams and dykes which kept the cavalry on the roads. German outposts were pushed back but the crossings were well-defended and dismounted cavalry attacks were not able to dislodge the German defenders. Cavalry which got to Warneton town square were withdrawn during the night. The attack was resumed on 18 October, when the cavalry attacked from Deûlémont to Tenbrielen but made no progress against a strong and well-organised German defence, ending the day opposite Deûlémont in the south to the railway at Tenbrielen to the north. From  the Cavalry Corps had

Battle

A German attack threatened the left flank of the 1st Cavalry Division (Major-General Beauvoir De Lisle), which held its position on Messines Ridge despite substantial casualties. The 3rd Cavalry Brigade of the 2nd Cavalry Division was shelled out of its positions at Kortewilde and the line was withdrawn to Hollebeke Château. Confusion over the orders, meant the units interpreted the order from Gough to retreat to this new line as an order for a general retreat beyond Hollebeke Château. Once this was realised, Gough ordered an immediate counter-thrust to recapture lost ground. The attack succeeded with little loss, against the German Cavalry Corps. Lieutenant-General Gustav von Hollen, given command of the Cavalry Corps after his performance commanding German IV Cavalry Corps on 20 October, was dismissed and replaced by General Georg von der Marwitz. The 6th Cavalry Brigade and the 7th Division moved to cover the gap that threatened the left flank.

To the south of the 7th Division and 3rd Cavalry Division, the 2nd Cavalry Division was not troubled by the II Bavarian Corps but German artillery caused some difficulty, when it shelled Hollebeke. The Germans forced the 3rd Cavalry Brigade out of position at midday. The 1st Cavalry Division repulsed German attacks to the south, aimed at Messines. Foch, the Commander in Chief of French forces in the north, sent eight battalions from French XVI Corps to Hollebeke and the French 32nd Division to St Eloi as reinforcements. In the morning a German attack attempted to push between Messines and the Comines Canal held by the Cavalry Corps. Fabeck moved the 6th Bavarian Reserve Division and the 26th Division of the II Bavarian Corps up, to begin the assault during the evening of 30 October.

The British conducted a house-to-house fight, retreating out of the town and then around noon, the 9th and 13th brigades of II Corps arrived and conducted an advance to the Messines road. The brigades engaged the 6th Bavarian Division, preventing it from supporting the 26th Division, the British suffering many losses, as did the Germans in their efforts to reach Messines. To the north of Messines, the 2nd Cavalry Division was engaged by elements of the 6th Bavarian Reserve Division and all of the 3rd Bavarian Division. Gough received six French artillery batteries and  Indian battalions but were opposed by  infantry. The French sent a Cuirassier and an infantry brigade from the 32nd Division, although they played little part in the battle. Despite heavy shelling by German guns from  no infantry assault took place until  due to the advance of II Corps on the right (south) of the 2nd Cavalry Division into the Bavarian flank.

Wytschaete was held by only  of the Household Cavalry Composite Regiment. Wytschaete had fallen at  but German infantry struggled to secure the ridge and did not succeed until  The 5th Cavalry Brigade and 9th Brigade committed 12th Lancers and Gough committed the 1st Lincolns and Northumberland Fusiliers from 9th Brigade, to retake the ridge and town. They failed at the ridge but the Lancers recaptured the town. The 1st Cavalry Division in the Messines area fell back and the lost ridges exposed Messines to German artillery-fire. As long as Wytschaete (to the north of Messines) and Warneton (to the south of Messines) remained in British hands, it was possible to prevent a German breakthrough in the south.

To safeguard their retirement, the British shelled Messines to prevent the Germans maintaining close contact. RFC aircraft were also busy, attacking German ground forces and harassing advancing columns. Elsewhere the Germans were less successful. The 3rd Pomeranian Division was brought up to drive the British back out of Wytschaete. The French rushed the 32nd Division of I Corps, to reinforce the British in the town and the 39th Division was assigned to recapture Messines. The 39th Division attack failed and the 32nd Division and the remaining British were pushed out of Wytschaete, by the 6th Bavarian Reserve Division of II Bavarian Corps; the Germans suffering many casualties attacking the French 32nd Division. By the morning of the 1 November, the Germans had secured the line and both towns but the ridges to the west of the Wytschaete–Messines line were held by the French 32nd Division. The British were exhausted and most divisions had been reduced to a shadow. The British 7th Division had only  left and was withdrawn from the line and replaced by the 8th Division from Britain. The Germans had also suffered high losses and needed to pause to reinforce their formations. The front fell quiet, action being limited to raids by both sides and heavy shelling of Ypres by German artillery. The Germans made their last effort against Ypres on 10 November.

Aftermath

Analysis

The French had been able to use the undamaged railways behind their front, to move troops more quickly than the Germans, who had to take long detours, wait for repairs to damaged tracks and replace rolling stock. The French used Belgian and captured German rail wagons and the domestic telephone and telegraph systems. The initiative held by the Germans in August was not recovered as all troop movements to the right flank were piecemeal.

Until the end of the Siege of Maubeuge  only the single line from Trier to Liège, Brussels, Valenciennes and Cambrai was available and had to be used to supply the German armies on the right, while the 6th Army travelled in the opposite direction, limiting the army to forty trains a day, which took four days to move a corps. Information on German troop movements from wireless interception, enabled the French to forestall German moves but the Germans had to rely on reports from spies, which were frequently wrong. The French resorted to more cautious infantry tactics, using cover to reduce casualties and centralised command as the German army commanders followed contradictory plans. The French did not need to obtain a quick decisive result and could concentrate on preserving the French army by parrying German blows.

Notes

Footnotes

References

Further reading

External links

 Battle of Messines, 12 October – 2 November 1914 at historyofwar.org
 British order of battle

Conflicts in 1914
Battles of World War I involving Germany
Battles of the Western Front (World War I)
1914 in Belgium
1914 in France
Race to the Sea
Battles of World War I involving Belgium
Battles of World War I involving the United Kingdom
Urban warfare
October 1914 events
November 1914 events
Battles in Flanders
Battle